Florida Artists Hall of Fame recognizes artists who have made significant contributions to art in Florida. It was established by the Florida Legislature in 1986. There is a Florida Artists Hall of Fame Wall on the Plaza Level in the rotunda of the Florida Capitol. The Florida Council on Arts and Culture reviews nominations annually and makes recommendations to the Florida Secretary of State. No more than two inductees are selected in any year until 2012 when four inductees were added.

In 2013 legendary Florida folk singer & songwriter Frank J. Thomas born and raised in Clay County; Latin pop superstar Gloria Estefan and painter Laura Woodward were inducted.

In 1986, the Hall was established by the Florida Legislature.  It provides recognition to persons, living or dead, who "made significant contributions to the arts in Florida either as performing or practicing artists in individual disciplines."  The awards recipients show diversity of artistic accomplishment in the state's "cultural tapestry."   Inductions take placed each March during the Florida Heritage Awards. Each honoree receives a commemorative bronze sculpture.  The sculpture, La Florida was created by Enzo Torcoletti.

Alphabetical list of inductees

See also
Great Floridians
 List of music museums

References

Halls of fame in Florida
Music halls of fame
State halls of fame in the United States
Awards established in 1987
Arts organizations established in 1986
1986 establishments in Florida
Tourist attractions in Tallahassee, Florida